Montfortia picta is a species of sea snail, a marine gastropod mollusk in the family Fissurellidae, the keyhole limpets and slit limpets.

References

 Dunker, W. (1860). Neue japanische Mollusken. Malakozoologische Blätter. 6: 221-240
 Poppe G.T. & Tagaro S.P. (2020). The Fissurellidae from the Philippines with the description of 26 new species. Visaya. suppl. 13: 1-131

External links
 Dunker, W. (1860). Neue japanische Mollusken. Malakozoologische Blätter. 6: 221-240
 To World Register of Marine Species

Fissurellidae
Gastropods described in 1860